"20 Good Reasons" was the first single from Thirsty Merc's second album Slideshows. It was released on 17 March 2007 and is to date the band's highest charting single, reaching number four on the Australian Singles Chart and number seventeen on the New Zealand Singles Chart. The song was nominated for 'Song of the Year' at the 2008 APRA awards. The single was also the number one most added track to radio across Australia in March 2007.

Music video
The music video for "20 Good Reasons" features the band playing in what appears to be a gritty warehouse of some kind. Intercut with the band scenes, the clip features a few couples going through various relationship troubles, echoing the story told by the song. The music video was a MySpace feature video for Australian visitors in April 2007 in preparation and for promotion of the forthcoming full-length album Slideshows. Thistlethwayte wrote the song when arriving in New York City once. He notes he did not write it asking a question about what love or relationships are about, however wrote it saying as a statement, but with the question as to why relationships are often troubled or "lost within all the hysteria".

Lost promotion
The song was used in the Seven Network's advertising for the hit television series, Lost—specifically its third season, which aired in 2007.

Track listing
 "20 Good Reasons"
 "Blood & Guts"
 "Midnight Sun"

Charts

Certifications

References

2007 singles
Thirsty Merc songs
Songs written by Rai Thistlethwayte
2006 songs
Warner Records singles